Martín Vassallo Argüello chose to not defend his 2008 title.
Horacio Zeballos won in the final 6–2, 3–6, 6–3, against Gastón Gaudio.

Seeds

Draw

Finals

Top half

Bottom half

References
Main Draw
Qualifying Draw

Copa Petrobras Buenos Aires
Copa Petrobras Buenos Aires